Dean Martin (1917–1995) was an American singer, actor, television personality and comedian.

Dean Martin may also refer to:
Dean Martin (disc jockey), English disc jockey on the Gold network
Dean Martin (footballer, born 1972), English footballer
Dean Martin (footballer, born 1957), English footballer
Dean Martin (politician), former Arizona State Treasurer, 2007–2011
Dean Paul Martin (1951–1987), American entertainer, son of the singer
"Dean Martin" (song), a song by Something for Kate

Martin, Dean